Hydaticus fractifer, is a species of predaceous diving beetle found in India, Andaman & Nicobar Islands and Sri Lanka.

References 

Dytiscidae
Insects of Sri Lanka
Insects described in 1858